Hans Andreas Ihlebæk (16 October 1930 – 2 July 1993) was a Norwegian journalist.

He started his career working in Rana Blad, Bergens Arbeiderblad and Vestfold Arbeiderblad between 1957 and 1965. After seven years at the Norwegian Journalist School, he became the secretary-general of the Norwegian Press Association in 1972. He stepped down in 1990, having made his mark on the debate about journalism ethics and standards.

References

1930 births
1993 deaths
20th-century Norwegian writers
20th-century Norwegian journalists